Pillars of Hope (called Pilares de Esperanza in some advertisements) is a specialty boarding school in Costa Rica, located on the former site of the Academy at Dundee Ranch that was  shut down by the Costa Rican government in 2003.

References

Boarding schools in Costa Rica